Evertz may refer to:

People:

Scott Evertz – Senior Vice President at Gibraltar Associates, LLC
Theodor Evertz – Franco-Flemish composer

Other:

Evertz Technologies – A broadcast equipment manufacturer in Burlington, Ontario